Gul-e-Rana may refer to:

 Gul-e-Rana (actress), Pakistani actress and politician
 Gul-e-Rana (TV series), Pakistani drama serial